Sinbad is an action-adventure fantasy family saga television series that aired on Sky1 from 8 July to 23 September 2012. It was produced by Impossible Pictures, the same company who made Walking with Dinosaurs and Primeval. The series stars Elliot Knight as the eponymous hero Sinbad.

On 27 February 2013, Sky announced that they had axed the show, saying its "story has now been told".

Premise
Sinbad accidentally kills the son of the powerful Lord Akbari in a fist fight.  As recompense for the blood debt, Sinbad's brother is killed in front of his eyes. Sinbad escapes, but his grandmother uses a magic talisman to curse him for the death of his brother. The curse prevents Sinbad from staying on land for more than one day; if he tarries the talisman will choke him to death. This prohibition against remaining on land leads to a life of adventure at sea that holds many wonders. Sinbad is unaware that he is still being hunted by Lord Akbari, who does not consider Sinbad's brother's death as sufficient payment of the blood debt.

Cast and characters

Episodes

Production
In August 2010, the Sky1 director of programmes Stuart Murphy announced the commission of several new television series, including a 12-part multimillion-pound Sinbad the Sailor adaptation in August 2010, with Impossible Pictures, a production company known for producing the ITV science fiction series Primeval, on board to produce the show. The announcement was made as Murphy wanted to shed Sky's reputation for broadcasting primarily foreign imports and "shifting the budget" to put "terrestrial levels of spend" behind the shows. The series was also intended to have "the ambition of Lost and the pace of 24". Filming began in Malta in February 2011.

Broadcast
The series was originally set to air during Autumn 2011, however, for unknown reasons, the series was delayed until the following summer. The series began broadcast on Sky1 weekly from 8 July 2012 during the 7:00pm time slot.

Ratings
The first episode received overnight ratings of 1.06 million viewers, and an audience share 4.7 percent. Peaking at 1.25 million at one point, it became the highest-rated pay television programme for the night. The first episode saw significant gains according to the final consolidated ratings, averaging 1.91 million viewers. However, over the following weeks ratings saw a gradual decline.

International broadcasters
Sinbad has also been sold to networks around the world from BBC Worldwide. In France, premium pay channel Canal+ pre-bought the rights to air the series in February 2012. Bell Media, a Canadian broadcaster, bought Sinbad and showed it on their Space channel. Nine Network also bought the rights to air the series in Australia. However, the BBC later took back the rights from Nine and sold it to the Australian Broadcasting Corporation instead, premiering on 8 September 2012. Syfy has picked up the series in the United States. In Italy, state-owned network RAI broadcast the show in its original version, also displaying English subtitles in order to help viewers familiarise with the foreign language.

Critical Reception
On the review aggregator website Rotten Tomatoes, 68% of 19 critics' reviews are positive, with an average rating of 5.40/10. The website's consensus reads, 'Sinbad has the swashbuckling adventure to liven up Arabian Nights at home, although the sailor's adventures can be often teeter from thrilling into corny.' Allison Keene of The Hollywood Reporter commended the 'fast-paced editing and snappy dialogue', and praised the diversity of the cast.

Home media
The series was released on DVD & Blu-ray in the United Kingdom on 22 October 2012 and in the United States on 3 September 2013.

References

External links

2010s British drama television series
2012 British television series debuts
2012 British television series endings
British drama television series
British fantasy television series
British supernatural television shows
Films based on Sinbad the Sailor
Sky UK original programming
Epic television series